Arch of Triumph is a 1948 American romantic war drama film directed by Lewis Milestone and starring Ingrid Bergman, Charles Boyer, and Charles Laughton. It is based on the 1945 novel Arch of Triumph by Erich Maria Remarque, which he wrote during his nine-year exile in the United States.

Plot
Pre-World War II Paris is crowded with illegal refugees, trying to evade deportation. One of them is Dr. Ravic, who practices medicine illegally under a false name, helping other refugees. He saves Joan Madou from committing suicide after the sudden death of her lover. They become involved, but he is deported and she becomes the mistress of Alex, a very wealthy man. Ravic eventually returns, still seeking revenge against the Nazi officer, von Haake, who tortured Ravic's  beloved to death. Von Haake is in Paris, in civilian dress, for some unknown, sinister purpose.

On September 1, 1939, Germany invades Poland. Two days later, Britain and France declare war on Germany. Ravic kills von Haake, but so quickly that the villain does not know why he is dying. Meanwhile, Joan's jealous lover shoots her, then comes to Ravic for help. The bullet has injured her spine. Paralyzed, except for her left arm, Ravic operates on her in a vain attempt to save her but she is left paralyzed. Dying, she begs him to end her suffering. He comforts her and  they speak of their love while she dies. He goes home to find that the authorities are checking papers at the hotel. He waits in line with his friend, Boris, who predicts a stay in a concentration camp. Ravic believes that they will be useful, now that war is here. Boris bids him an affectionate farewell, promising to meet at Fouquet's after the war. The last shot of the film is through the Arc de Triomphe.

Cast
Ingrid Bergman as Joan Madou
Charles Boyer as Dr. Ravic
Charles Laughton as von Haake
Louis Calhern as Boris Morosov
Ruth Warrick as Kate Bergstroem [scenes deleted]
Roman Bohnen as Dr. Veber
J. Edward Bromberg as Hotel manager at the Verdun
Ruth Nelson as Madame Fessier
Stephen Bekassy as Alex
Curt Bois as Tattooed waiter
Art Smith as Inspector
Michael Romanoff as Capt. Alidze

Background and production

The film's name is a reference to the Arc de Triomphe in Paris, where the film is set.

Irwin Shaw spent five months writing a screenplay which minimized the love story. Lewis Milestone disagreed with this and other aspects of his script. Milestone and Harry Brown created their own version, which was preferred by the producers and Ingrid Bergman.

The rough cut of the film was four hours long, and several subplots and at least one actor were cut in reducing it to two hours.

Ingrid Bergman's salary was $175,000 + 25% of net profits.

William Conrad, in his fourth film, has a small, important (uncredited) role as a policeman.

The head of the MPAA's Production Code Administration at the time, Joseph Breen, made the studio tone down the violence in the script.

Breen also objected to the fact that the murder went unpunished, but he relented on the basis that it was a war story.

1984 film for television 
In 1984, Charles E. Israel adapted the novel for British television, with Anthony Hopkins as Dr. Ravic, Donald Pleasence as von Haake, Lesley-Anne Down as Joan Madou and Frank Finlay as Boris Morosov.  Waris Hussein directed. This made-for-television film was released in the United States in 1985.

See also
Production Code

References

External links
 
 
 

Arch of Triumph
1947 romantic drama films
American black-and-white films
Films based on works by Erich Maria Remarque
Films directed by Lewis Milestone
Films set in 1939
Films set in 1940
Films set in Paris
American war drama films
Films based on German novels
Films with screenplays by Harry Brown (writer)
Films produced by David L. Loew
1940s war drama films
American romantic drama films
American World War II films
1940s English-language films
1940s American films
United Artists films